Sağlık railway station is a railway station  in the village of Sağlık, Turkey. The station used to be serviced by the Turkish State Railways but is now a part of the Southern Line extension to Selçuk. The station was originally built in 1862 by the Ottoman Railway Company and taken over by the state railways in 1935. Sağlık reopened on 8 September 2017 along with the Selçuk extension of the southern line.

Connections

References

Railway stations in İzmir Province
Railway stations opened in 1862